The 2021 ISU World Team Trophy is an international figure skating competition that was held from April 15–18, 2021 in Osaka, Japan. The top six International Skating Union members were invited to compete in a team format with points awarded based on skaters' placement. Participating countries selected two men's single skaters, two ladies' single skaters, one pair, and one ice dance entry for their team.

Impact of the COVID-19 pandemic 
Despite the majority of the season's ISU Championship-level events having been cancelled during the COVID-19 pandemic, the ISU decided to host the World Team Trophy, if possible. The Japan Skating Federation announced that limited tickets would be available to the public. Despite the COVID prevention measures implemented in the prefecture, the socially-distanced arena reportedly sold out. The opening day of competition took place with seating limited to alternate seats and masks required for all in attendance.

Osaka Prefecture governor Hirofumi Yoshimura announced on April 1, 2021 that he plans to make Osaka City a target area for "priority measures such as spread prevention" for one month from April 5. In line with the tightened restrictions, both Yoshimura and Osaka City Mayor Ichirō Matsui called for the cancellation of the 2020 Summer Olympics torch relay leg scheduled to begin in Osaka City on April 14, one day before the World Team Trophy. The eventual cancellation of the public torch relay leg, coupled with record-setting case numbers in Osaka, raised questions about whether the World Team Trophy should proceed as scheduled. In addition to the torch relay leg, an ITU Triathlon World Cup event scheduled to be held in Osaka in May was cancelled and sport officials for an Olympic test event could not enter Japan because of coronavirus restrictions. On April 7, Governor Yoshimura declared a medical state of emergency in the prefecture following record numbers of COVID cases in the region.

Scoring 
Skaters competed in both the short program/rhythm dance and the free skating/free dance segments for their team. Each segment was scored separately. The points earned per placement are as follows:

Tie-breaking within a segment:
 If two or more skaters, pairs, or ice dance couples have the same rank in a segment, then the total technical score will be used to break ties.
If these results do not break the tie, the competitors concerned will be considered tied. The team points will be awarded according to the placement of the skaters/couples in each discipline.

Tie-breaking within team standings:
 The highest total team points from the two best places in different disciplines of the current phase will break the ties.
 If they remain tied, the highest total segment scores of the two best places according to the team points in different disciplines of the current phase will break the ties.
 If they remain tied, the highest total team points from the three best places in different disciplines of the current phase will break the ties.
 If they remain tied, the highest total segment scores of the three best places according to the team points in different disciplines of the current phase will break the ties.
If these criteria fail to break the ties, the teams will be considered as tied.

Entries 
Names with an asterisk (*) denote the team captain.

Nations began announcing their entries shortly after the 2021 World Championships. The International Skating Union published a complete list of entries on March 31, 2021.

Changes to preliminary entries 
China was among the top six qualifying nations, but the Chinese Skating Association declined the invitation; China was replaced by France. Skate Canada opted not to send any of its World team members, as the mandatory two-week quarantine period upon returning to Canada left them with no time to train before needing to leave for Japan.

Results

Team standings

Men

Ladies

Pairs

Ice dance

Medalists

References

External links 
  
 2021 World Team Trophy at the International Skating Union
 Results

World Team Trophy
ISU World Team Trophy
ISU World Team Trophy
International figure skating competitions hosted by Japan